Meta Portal (also known as Portal) is a brand of smart displays and videophones released in 2018 by Facebook Inc. (now named Meta Platforms). The product line consists of four models (Portal, Portal+, Portal TV, and Portal Go) that provide video chat via Messenger and WhatsApp, augmented by a camera that can automatically zoom and track people's movements. The devices are integrated with Amazon's voice-controlled intelligent personal assistant service Alexa. Meta uses some data collected from Portal devices for targeted advertising.

Reviewers rated the Portal line's video and audio handling capabilities positively, but criticized Facebook's privacy practices for commercial use of data that Portal devices captured.

History 
On October 8, 2018, Facebook, Inc. announced the sale and shipment of the  Portal and the  Portal Plus. The second generation of Portal devices was announced on September 18, 2019; the second-generation Portal and Portal Mini were released on October 15, while Portal TV was released on November 5. On September 21, 2021, Facebook announced 2 new devices, a battery powered 10-inch device called "Portal Go" and a new generation of the 14-inch device called "Portal+".

In June 2022, it was reported that Meta was preparing to phase out Portal as a consumer product and instead focus on the enterprise market.

Later, in November 2022, it was reported that Meta would discontinue both its Portal and two remaining unreleased smartwatches. This came after Meta cut some 11,000 jobs at the company as a cost cutting measure.

Devices

Portal 
Portal was the original  device released in 2018.  The second generation device in 2019 also supported portrait orientation, which was much more convenient when video calling someone on a smart phone, typically held in portrait orientation.

Portal+ 
The original  Portal+ was released in 2018 alongside the smaller Portal. This product was not upgraded in the 2019 releases. In 2021, a slightly smaller  new Portal+ was released which, like the previous version, is fixed in landscape orientation but has a mechanism to tilt the screen.

Portal Mini 
Portal Mini was introduced in 2019 alongside the second generation Portal. It was a similar form factor allowing use in either portrait or landscape orientation. The Mini was discontinued after the 2021 release cycle.

Portal TV 
Portal TV was released in September 2019 alongside the second generation portal. This device has a form factor similar to the Microsoft Kinect with a built in camera and microphone but no display. It connects to a TV, enabling the TV to have features similar to other devices in the Portal family.

Portal Go 
Portal Go was first introduced in Fall 2021. This  device is a similar design to the first generation Portal only offering landscape mode. This is the first battery powered Portal device allowing the user to remove it from the charging cradle and relocate it to other locations without powering down.

Portal for Business 
Portal for Business is a software package announced in Fall 2021 that allows any of the portal devices to operate as conference room machines, supporting various third-party calling platforms as well as ties into business applications such as calendar.

Privacy 
According to Facebook, the Portal devices only record audio after the user speaks the "Hey Portal" command, and only record video during video calling sessions. Each Portal device also includes a cover that can be slid over the camera when not in use.

During the product announcement, Facebook initially claimed that data obtained from Portal devices would not be used for targeted advertising. One week after the announcement, Facebook changed its position and stated that "usage data such as length of calls, frequency of calls" and "general usage data, such as aggregate usage of apps, etc., may also feed into the information that we use to serve ads". The company later clarified that it analyzes the metadata, not the content, of video calls made through Portal devices.

Reception

Critical reception

First generation 
Dan Seifert of The Verge found the video and audio quality of Portal's video calling feature via Facebook Messenger to be better than that of competing devices and videotelephony services, but said that "Outside of video calling, the Portal's functionality is rather limited." In light of the Facebook–Cambridge Analytica data scandal, he expressed concerns that the product is "always-watching and always-listening". Megan Wollerton of CNET praised the device's autotracking wide-angle cameras, which allow the subject to remain centered in the device's field of view. Wollerton also had reservations regarding Facebook's privacy policy in relation to Portal's video calls and wrote, "a spokesperson told us that Facebook will, in fact, track information about calls made via Portal to expand on the user profiles it uses to inform ads that show up elsewhere."

In a PC Magazine review, Sascha Segan said, "From a purely technical standpoint, this is by far the best video calling appliance we've seen", and believed that Portal would be a good complement for remote workers if it gains integration with Workplace by Facebook, a feature that is not yet released. However, Segan considered Portal a "horror" from "a policy and privacy perspective" because of the "massive abuses of data on Facebook's consumer platform". Writing for Tom's Guide, Mike Prospero and Monica Chin criticized the "large and obtrusive" size of the display, characterizing it as "dystopian" and "more at home in a Black Mirror episode than in my living room or kitchen". The reviewers echoed "Ongoing privacy concerns", but presented a favorable impression of Portal's automatic panning and audio quality.

Second generation 
In Engadget, Nicole Lee complimented the second-generation Portal's subdued appearance and ability to be used in both portrait and landscape orientations. Adrienne So of Wired highlighted Portal's video tracking and augmented reality features, but denounced Facebook's inclination to "default to sharing more, not less".

Segan's review of the Portal TV in PC Magazine contrasted the device's competitive video calling capabilities with its "thin" support for streaming media services, and criticized Facebook's data security record. In a negative CNET review, Wollerton stated that the Portal TV is "a solidly performing, decently priced device that just isn't suited for anyone because of the privacy concerns and increasingly alarming issues" affecting Facebook.

Reviews posted on Amazon by Facebook employees
On January 17, 2019, The New York Times columnist Kevin Roose posted on Twitter that Facebook Portal's Amazon product listing contained five-star reviews that appeared to have been written by Facebook employees, including one who claimed to have "historically not been a big Facebook or other social media user" before purchasing Portal. These reviews were written in violation of Amazon's community guidelines, which forbid "creating, modifying, or posting content regarding your (or your relative's, close friend's, business associate's, or employer's) products or services". In response, Facebook's augmented and virtual-reality vice president Andrew Bosworth stated that the reviews were "neither coordinated nor directed from the company" and indicated that Facebook would instruct the employees to remove them.

References

External links
 

Products introduced in 2018
Portal
Smart speakers